Horse Thief Lake is a lake in Pennington County, South Dakota. It is approximately two miles northwest of Mount Rushmore, the closest lake to the monument. The lake's name is derived from the fact a gang of horse thieves operated there.

See also
List of lakes in South Dakota

References

External links

Lakes of South Dakota
Protected areas of Pennington County, South Dakota
Black Hills National Forest
Bodies of water of Pennington County, South Dakota